Woodbury is a town in Litchfield County, Connecticut, United States. The population was 9,723 at the 2020 census. The town center, comprising the adjacent villages of Woodbury and North Woodbury, is designated by the U.S. Census Bureau as the Woodbury Center census-designated place (CDP). Woodbury was founded in 1673.

The center of Woodbury is distinctive because, unlike many New England towns, it is not nucleated. In Woodbury, the older buildings are arrayed in linear fashion along both sides of a road that stretches for over a mile. The public buildings in the National Register Historic District include the First Congregational Church (1818), the Old Town Hall (1846), the United Methodist Church, the St. Paul's Episcopal Church (1785), and the North Congregational Church (1816).

The most notable of the public buildings is the Masonic Temple (1839). It is a modest, clapboard, Greek Revival temple, notable less for its architecture than for its dramatic location, situated atop a high cliff accessed by a long flight of steps (there is a modern road at the rear). It is visible from a distance and is especially dramatic at night, when it is illuminated by spotlights. The Woodbury Temple echoes the many temples of the Greek world that were perched at the edge of high places from which they could be seen from miles around and from far out at sea.

Originally, the many historic houses on the street were residential. In the late twentieth century they were occupied by a series of antique shops. Woodbury is often referred to as Connecticut's antiques capital.

Woodbury is one of the two towns in Litchfield County, along with Bethlehem, served by the area code 203/area code 475 overlay.

Geography
Woodbury is in southern Litchfield County and is bordered to the south by New Haven County.

Woodbury lies in the Pomperaug River valley, a tributary of the Housatonic River. The Pomperaug River is formed in Woodbury by the confluence of the Nonnewaug River and the Weekeepeemee River.

Principal communities
Hotchkissville
Minortown
Neufa
North Woodbury
Pomperaug
Woodbury Center
Woodlake

Climate
Woodbury has a humid continental climate (Köppen climate classification Dfb).

<div style="width:100%">

</div style>

History
The founders of Woodbury came from Stratford, Connecticut, in the early 1670s. Ancient Woodbury consisted of the present towns of Woodbury, Southbury, Roxbury, Bethlehem, most of Washington and parts of Middlebury and Oxford.

Two groups of settlers came from Stratford. The first group, religious dissidents unhappy with the church in Stratford, was led by Woodbury's first minister, the Reverend Zachariah Walker. The second group, led by Deacon Samuel Sherman, had been given approval by the general court to purchase land from local Native Americans in order to establish a new settlement. The two groups, consisting of fifteen families (about fifty people), arrived in ancient Woodbury, known as "Pomperaug Plantation", early in 1673.

In 1673, these original settlers drew up an agreement called the "Fundamental Articles", which proclaimed that as many settlers as could be accommodated would be welcomed to the new settlement. The Fundamental Articles stated that expenses of establishing the settlement would be shared by its inhabitants, and that no one was to be given more than twenty-five or less than ten acres of land. Other sections of the articles provided for common land and for land saved to be divided up for future inhabitants of the settlement.
 
Signers of the Fundamental Articles:

The settlement was named Woodbury, which means "dwelling place in the woods", and was first recognized as a town in 1674. Deacon and captain John Minor was the first leader of the community during Woodbury's early years. Minor was the first town clerk and, along with Lieutenant Joseph Judson, served as the first deputy to the Connecticut General Court from the town of Woodbury. On October 9, 1751, the town of Woodbury was transferred from Fairfield County at the formation of Litchfield County.

On March 25, 1783, a meeting of ten Episcopal clergy in Woodbury elected Samuel Seabury the first American Episcopal bishop, the second presiding bishop of the Episcopal Church in the United States, and the first bishop of Connecticut.

The Woodbury Songbook

The German composer Hanns Eisler, who had taken asylum in the United States after fleeing from the Nazi rule in Germany, spent three and a half months (from June 15 to September 30, 1941) in Woodbury as the guest of another German refugee, Dr. Joachim Schumacher, and his wife Sylvia. Joachim Schumacher taught classes in art history, musicology, philosophy, and other subjects at the Westover School in Middlebury. Sylvia Schumacher taught piano at Westover School and privately in her home. Joachim Schumacher enticed Eisler to compose 20 songs on 16 US children's verses or nursery rhymes and four texts in the German language by Goethe, Eduard Mörike and Ignazio Silone. The songs were composed for female voices and suitable for a school chorus. This was published as The Woodbury Songbook, or, in German, Das Woodbury Liederbüchlein with the lyrics in English and German, unfortunately with a wrong spelling of Woodbury (with two "r"s). The German translations are by Wieland Herzfelde.

Demographics

At the 2010 census there were 9,984 people, 4,219 households, and 2,772 families in the town. The racial makeup of the town was 97.25% White, 0.53% African American, 0.22% Native American, 1.15% Asian, 0.07% Pacific Islander, 0.22% from other races, and 0.57% from two or more races. Hispanic or Latino of any race were 1.65%.

Of the 3,715 households 31.4% had children under the age of 18 living with them, 58.9% were married couples living together, 8.0% had a female householder with no husband present, and 30.7% were non-families. 25.4% of households were one person and 8.7% were one person aged 65 or older.  The average household size was 2.48 and the average family size was 2.99.

The age distribution was 24.0% under the age of 18, 4.4% from 18 to 24, 29.3% from 25 to 44, 29.3% from 45 to 64, and 13.0% 65 or older.  The median age was 41 years. For every 100 females, there were 95.3 males.  For every 100 females age 18 and over, there were 91.8 males.

The median household income was $68,322 and the median family income was $82,641. Males had a median income of $53,246 versus $35,298 for females. The per capita income for the town was $37,903.  About 2.3% of families and 4.5% of the population were below the poverty line, including 4.9% of those under age 18 and 6.3% of those age 65 or over.

CDP
At the 2000 census, there were x people, 618 households, and 336 families in the CDP. The racial makeup of the CDP was 98.07% White, 0.85% African American, 0.15% Native American, 0.39% Asian, 0.31% from other races, and 0.23% from two or more races. Hispanic or Latino of any race were 1.16% of the population.

Of the 618 households 25.1% had children under the age of 18 living with them, 41.9% were married couples living together, 9.5% had a female householder with no husband present, and 45.5% were non-families. 39.3% of households were one person and 15.7% were one person aged 65 or older. The average household size was 2.10 and the average family size was 2.82.

The age distribution was 20.6% under the age of 18, 5.2% from 18 to 24, 30.2% from 25 to 44, 28.1% from 45 to 64, and 15.9% 65 or older. The median age was 40 years. For every 100 females, there were 85.4 males. For every 100 females age 18 and over, there were 79.1 males.

The median household income was $51,136 and the median family income was $65,227. Males had a median income of $50,625 versus $40,729 for females. The per capita income for the CDP was $30,277. None of the families and 4.6% of the population were living below the poverty line, including no under eighteens and 8.9% of those over 64.

Government
Woodbury is currently located in Connecticut's 5th congressional district, and is represented by Democrat Jahana Hayes. The town is part of Connecticut's 32nd State Senate District and is represented by State Sen. Eric Berthel.

Politics
Woodbury is one of the most reliably Republican towns in the United States. Since its founding in 1854, every Republican presidential candidate has carried Woodbury, even in nationwide Democratic landslides such as 1912, 1936, and 1964 in which Democratic candidates won Connecticut. Only four times, in 1884, the aforementioned 1912, 1992, and 1996 has the GOP candidate for president not received an absolute majority of the vote. In the eleven elections from 1920–1960, the Republican candidates all broke 70% of the vote in Woodbury, with the party's best showing coming in 1928 when Herbert Hoover received 84.17% of the vote. The best showing for any Democrat in Woodbury since the founding of the GOP occurred in 1964 when Lyndon Johnson received 48.82% of the vote in an election where he won Connecticut with 67.81% of the vote.

Similarly, Woodbury has also supported the last 32 GOP campaigns for governor of Connecticut.

Prior to the GOP’s founding, Woodbury supported Whig presidential nominees Winfield Scott, Zachray Taylor, Henry Clay, and John Quincy Adams in 1852, 1848, 1832, and 1828 respectively. Adams of whom has the largest percentage of the vote since 1828 for a presidential candidate in Woodbury at 88.36%. In 1836, 1840, and 1844, Martin Van Buren, and James K. Polk carried Woodbury, they remain the only two Democratic presidential candidates to carry the town, as of the 2020 presidential election.

The results for Woodbury in all presidential elections since 1828, and all gubernatorial elections since 1924 can be found below:

Education
Woodbury is part of the Region 14 School District consisting of Nonnewaug High School, Woodbury Middle School, Bethlehem Elementary School, Mitchell Elementary School, and STAR Preschool Program.

Infrastructure

Transportation

U.S. Route 6 is the main thoroughfare in the town, leading northeast  to Watertown and south  to Southbury. Other highways in the town include Route 47, leading northwest to Washington; Route 61, leading north from the eastern part of town to Bethlehem; Route 132, leading north from the center of Woodbury to Bethlehem; and Route 317, leading west to Roxbury.

Notable locations

Glebe House
Jabez Bacon House
Hotchkissville Historic District, listed on the National Register of Historic Places in 1995
St. Paul's Episcopal Church
The Soldiers Monument
The Hollow Park

Notable people

 Leroy Anderson (1908–1975), composer ("Sleigh Ride" and many other works); lived in Woodbury from 1948 until his death in 1975. His widow Eleanor Anderson (1918–2014) lived in Woodbury from 1948 until her death 
 Mac Baldrige (1922–1987), 26th United States Secretary of Commerce; lived in Woodbury until his death in 1987
 Joe Beck (1945–2008), jazz guitarist; lived in Woodbury until his death in 2008
 Hayden Carruth (1921–2008), poet and critic; grew up in the town
 Santino Ferrucci, racing driver; born in the town in 1998
 Alexander Hamilton (1847–1928), rector of St. Paul's Episcopal Church
 Kay Sage (1898–1963), surrealist painter; lived in Woodbury from 1940 until her death
 Henry Shelton Sanford (1823–1891), diplomat and the founder of Sanford, Florida; born in Woodbury
 Yves Tanguy (1900–1955), surrealist painter; lived in Woodbury from 1940 until his death
 William Robert Taylor (1820–1909), governor of Wisconsin; born in Woodbury
 Robert Templeton (1929–1991), presidential portraitist and civil rights artist; lived in Woodbury and maintained his studio there from 1965 until his death
 Rob Zombie, musician and movie director; moved to the town in January 2009 with his spouse Sheri Moon and has since sold his house and moved from town.

Local media
Waterbury Republican-American, independent daily newspaper
Voices, a local newspaper serving Southbury, Middlebury, Oxford, Seymour, Naugatuck, Woodbury, Bethlehem, New Preston, Washington, Washington Depot, Roxbury, Bridgewater, Monroe, Sandy Hook and Newtown

References

Further reading

External links

Official town website
Tribury Chamber of Commerce

 
Towns in Litchfield County, Connecticut
Populated places established in 1672
1672 establishments in Connecticut
Towns in the New York metropolitan area
Towns in Connecticut